Englevale is an unincorporated community in Lincoln Township, Crawford County, Kansas, United States.

History
Englevale was laid out in the fall of 1890. It was named for Dan Engle, the original owner of the town site.

The post office in the community was established on 14 January 1891 and discontinued on 30 June 1954.  Its name was originally "Calvin." The town was a stop on the Missouri Pacific Railroad.

References

Further reading

External links
 Crawford County maps: Current, Historic, KDOT

Unincorporated communities in Crawford County, Kansas
Unincorporated communities in Kansas